Don't Stop Me Now may refer to:

Film and television
 Don't Stop Me Now (TV series), a talent show broadcast on Sky1
 Don't Stop Me Now (film), a 2019 Italian comedy film

Music
 Don't Stop Me Now!, 1967 studio album by Cliff Richard
 "Don't Stop Me Now", a hit single by the band Queen, later covered by McFly
 "Don't Stop Me Now", a 2019 song by First Ladies of Disco
 "Don't Stop Me Now", a song by the Rossington Collins Band from their album This is the Way
 "Don't Stop Me Now", a song by Status Quo from their album Never Too Late
 "Don't Stop Me Now", a song by Toto from their album Fahrenheit

Other uses
Don't Stop Me Now!!, a 2007 book by Jeremy Clarkson